Freedom of the press in Pakistan is legally protected by the law of Pakistan as stated in its constitutional amendments, while the sovereignty, national integrity, and moral principles are generally protected by the specified media law, Freedom of Information Ordinance 2002, and Code of Conduct Rules 2010. In Pakistan, the code of conduct and ordinance act comprises a set of rules for publishing, distributing, and circulating news stories and operating media organizations working independently or running in the country.

The law of Pakistan (in media) maintains a hybrid legal system for independent journalism, while it prohibits media bias or misleading information under certain constitutional amendments as described by the country's constitution. Media crime which is described by the country's criminal codes is recognized as an unlawful act.

Nevertheless, freedom of the press in Pakistan is subject to certain restrictions, such as defamation law, a lack of protection for whistleblowers, barriers to information access, and constraints caused by public and government hostility to journalists. The press, including print, television, radio, and internet are amended to express their concerns under the selected provisions such as PEMRA Ordinance 2002, Defamation Ordinance 2002, Broadcasting Corporation Act, 1973, and Code of Conduct for Media Broadcasters/Cable TV Operators. The Protection of Journalists Act, of 2014 allows a journalist or media industry to cover any story and brought it to the audiences without impacting the national security of the country.

To protect the intellectual, moral, and fundamental rights of the citizens, the government has taken several countermeasures to combat circulating fake news and restricting objectionable content across multiple platforms. The law of Pakistan prohibits spreading or publishing fake news through social or mass media, and could lead to the imprisonment of a journalist or a newspaper ban.

Journalists accuse the military and security agencies of suppressing negative publicity.

Global ranking 
In 2020, Pakistan's press freedom rank dropped to 145 out of 180 countries in the Press Freedom Index, an annual ranking of countries published by Reporters Without Borders (RWB), an international non-governmental organization dedicated to safeguarding the right to freedom of information. In 2019, the country's press freedom rank was recorded as 142 on Press Freedom Index, making it a slight decline from the previous annual report. Pakistan's global index rank declined for several issues such as killings of journalists, restrictions imposed on news media, withdrawal of government ads threats, harassment, violation of independent journalism, detention, abduction, and frivolous lawsuits against journalists.

Targeting victims such as physical abuse against journalists and prejudice is one of the other reasons for the decline in the world ranking index. The annual report stated the declination of rank for several unlawful reasons such as written and verbal threats of murder, and offline and online harassment. The report argued self-censorship in the country.

Reactions 
The prime minister of Pakistan in his speech during a visit to the United States criticized the report published by Reporters Without Borders citing that "curbs on press freedom in Pakistan was a joke". His remarks on the global annual report were subsequently criticized by the RWB.

Censorship on press 
The government of Pakistan is often argued for carrying self-censorship and detentions of journalists under single-issue politics. Sometimes, the only news that favors the regime is published by the local media, whilst news that covers the economic and political problems in the country, or criticisms of the regime faces threatening warnings from the state. The print and broadcasting media claims to carry stories under political pressure since Pakistan Tehreek-e-Insaf (PTI), a major political party in Pakistan came into power.

The Council of Pakistan Newspaper Editors, a nonprofit organization of Pakistan dedicated to safeguards of journalists and media outlets argued Pakistan's direct and self-censorship and state-sponsored hostility towards independent journalists working in the country. In the recent years (around 2018 or 2019), seven journalists were killed while fifteen others were injured in different violences. In Pakistan, sixty journalists were allegedly charged under Anti-Terrorism Act. The government, however, cited the issue with the country's law and order. In 2019 or earlier, the administration, first time in the history of Pakistan temporarily banned a journalist for possessing the material unlawfully. The federal government-owned agency Pakistan Electronic Media Regulatory Authority (PEMRA), responsible for regulating and issuing channel licenses for establishment of the mass, print and electronic media, restricted some news presenters from participating in debates on Talk shows, and later the restrictions were lifted after sixty days.

In 2019, the government suspended news TV channels, including Channel 24, Abb Takk News, and Capital TV for broadcasting the opposition party's program on their channels. Reporters Without Borders criticized the action citing "brazen censorship". The government, however, suspended under a set of new laws for media regulators to attempt to restrict press conferences convicted or on-trial politicians.

On 4th January 2023, the Pakistan Telecommunications Authority (PTA) blocked Wikipedia for blasphemous content. The spokesperson from PTA told the press that it would remain blocked until it removes all the objectionable material. Pakistan also blocked Youtube from 2012 to 2016 for blasphemous content again Prophet Mohammed.

Cult of personality 
The media have consistently upheld the personality cult of the leaders since the country's formation. The journalists in the country have experienced troubles during the military dictatorship, the PTI government led by Imran Khan, however, partially restored independent journalism. Sometimes, Imran Khan's government is argued for direct censorship following the Balochistan conflict. In 2011, the tenth and the former president of Pakistan Pervez Musharraf is often claimed for expanding independent journalism in the country. He is also argued for banning the television news channels during 2007 Pakistani state of emergency.

References

Freedom of information legislation
Law of Pakistan
Censorship in Pakistan
Pakistani legislation
Mass media in Pakistan